Paul Casey is a British golfer.

Paul Casey may also refer to:

 Paul Casey (Gaelic footballer) (born 1981), Irish Gaelic footballer
 Paul Casey (footballer, born 1961), English association footballer
 Paul Casey (footballer, born 1969), English goalkeeper
 Paul Casey (musician) Irish singer, guitarist and songwriter

See also
 Paul Kasey (born 1973), English actor